Paul A. Goble (born 1949) is an American analyst, writer and columnist with expertise on Russia. Trained at Miami University (B.A., 1970) and the University of Chicago (M.A., 1973), he is the editor of four volumes on ethnic issues in the former Soviet Union and has published more than 150 articles on ethnic and nationality questions. Goble served as special adviser on Soviet nationality issues and Baltic affairs to Secretary of State James Baker.

He currently teaches a course on "Islam and Geopolitics in Eurasia" as an adjunct professor at the Institute of World Politics.

Career
 Director of Research and Publications, Azerbaijan Diplomatic Academy
 University of Tartu (Estonia), former Professor
 International Broadcasting Bureau, Special Advisor to the Director
 Voice of America, Senior Advisor to the Director
 Radio Free Europe/Radio Liberty, Assistant Director for Broadcasting and Director of Communications
 Senior Associate, Carnegie Endowment for International Peace
 Special Advisor on Soviet Nationality Problems, U.S. Department of State
 Deputy Director, Research Department, Radio Liberty
 Analyst on Soviet Nationalities, Department of State’s Bureau of Intelligence and Research, Central Intelligence Agency.
 Adjunct professor at the Institute of World Politics, teaching a course on "Islam and Geopolitics in Eurasia".
 Is presently a columnist for Euromaidan Press

Awards
Paul Goble has been decorated with these state awards for his role in promoting the recovery of Baltic independence:
Order of the Cross of Terra Mariana, Estonia
Order of the Three Stars, Latvia
Order of the Lithuanian Grand Duke Gediminas, Lithuania

Published works
Books
 The Situation in Russia: October 1993, Briefing of the Commission on Security and Cooperation in Europe, United States Congress, 1993 (with Ariel Cohen).

Articles
 "Russia and Its Neighbors", Foreign Policy, No. 90 (Spring, 1993), Carnegie Endowment for International Peace
 "Forget the Soviet Union", Foreign Policy, No. 86 (Spring, 1992), Carnegie Endowment for International Peace
 "Chechnya and Its Consequences", Post-Soviet Affairs, 1995
 "Russia as a Failed State: Difficulties and Foreign Challenges", Baltic Defense Review, 2004

References

External links
 "Window on Eurasia - New Series", Paul A. Goble's current blog
 "Window on Eurasia", Paul A. Goble's earlier blog
 Paul Goble at the Institute of World Politics
 Paul A. Goble on Ukrainian Policy
 Paul A. Goble on The Interpreter Magazine
 

Living people
Academic staff of the University of Tartu
Analysts of the Central Intelligence Agency
1949 births
Recipients of the Order of the Cross of Terra Mariana, 1st Class
Recipients of the Order of the Lithuanian Grand Duke Gediminas
United States Department of State officials
Russian studies scholars
Miami University alumni
University of Chicago alumni
The Institute of World Politics faculty